The Stoessel lute is a string instrument invented by Georg Stössel in 1914 in Cologne (Köln), Germany. Its steel strings are fingered not by putting one's hand round the neck, but over the end of it. To this end, most Stössel lutes have very short necks. It is, in effect, a hybrid between a necked string instrument and a zither. 

The instrument was very popular in Germany and elsewhere in the early 20th century; it was frequently used in German and Austrian schools in the inter-war period. The Second World War put an end to production and the instrument never regained its former popularity.

References

External links
 The Stössel-lute, Greg Miner, Miner Music
 miscellaneous at ATLAS of Plucked Instruments
 Zither & Harp at SpringerMusic.co.uk

String instruments
German musical instruments
Fretted zithers
1914 musical instruments